Asadabad-e Vosta may refer to:

 Asadabad-e Vosta, Ilam
 Asadabad-e Vosta, Delfan, Lorestan Province
 Asadabad-e Vosta, Selseleh, Lorestan Province